In oviparous biology, a hatchling is a newly hatched fish, amphibian, reptile, or bird. A group of mammals called monotremes lay eggs, and their young are hatchlings as well.

Fish
Fish hatchlings generally do not receive parental care, similar to reptiles. Like reptiles, fish hatchlings can be affected by xenobiotic compounds. For example, exposure to xenoestrogens can feminize fish. As well, hatchlings raised in water with high levels of carbon dioxide demonstrate unusual behaviour, such as being attracted to the scent of predators. This change could be reversed by immersion into gabazine water, leading to the hypothesis that acidic waters affect hatchling brain chemistry.

Amphibians

The behavior of an amphibian hatchling, commonly referred to as a tadpole, is controlled by a few thousand neurons. 99% of a Xenopus hatchling's first day after hatching is spent hanging from a thread of mucus secreted from near its mouth will eventually form; if it becomes detached from this thread, it will swim back and become reattached, usually within ten seconds. While newt hatchlings are only able to swim for a few seconds, Xenopus tadpoles may be able to swim for minutes as long as they do not bump into anything. The tadpole live from remaining yolk-mass in the gut for a period, before it swims off to find food.

Reptiles

The reptile hatchling is quite the opposite of an altricial bird hatchling. Most hatchling reptiles are born with the same instincts as their parents and leave to live on their own immediately after leaving the egg. When first hatched, hatchlings can be several times smaller than their adult forms: Pine Snakes weigh 30 grams when they first hatch, but can grow up to 1,400 grams as adults. This appears to have been the case even in dinosaurs. In sea turtles, hatchling sex is determined by incubation temperature. In species in which eggs are laid then buried in sand, indentations in the sand can be a clue to imminent hatching. In sea turtles, this usually occurs about 60 days after the laying of eggs, and often at night. However, exposure to xenobiotic compounds, especially endocrine-disrupting compounds, can affect hatchling sex ratios as well. Persistent Organic Pollutants (POPs) and other pollutants like octylphenol are also known to increase rate of hatchling mortality and deformity. Upon hatching, animals such as turtles have innate navigational skills, including compass and beacon methods of navigation, to reach safety. For example, turtle hatchlings instinctively swim against waves to ensure they leave the beach and its predators. They also head towards the brightest part of the horizon in order to reach the water: however, human activity has created sources of light which mislead the turtle hatchlings, causing them to not travel directly to the water, making them vulnerable to dehydration and predation. Hatchlings of the species Iguana iguana also gain gut flora essential to digestion from adults as part of their development. In the wild, hatchling survival rates are extremely low due to factors such as predation, for example, by crabs, as well as due to human-made obstacles. Human intervention has also benefitted hatchling reptiles at times. For example, late-hatched loggerhead turtles are taken in by such groups as the University of Georgia to be raised. In species such as crocodiles, hydration levels also play an important role in embryo survival.

As pets
Reptile hatchlings, especially those of turtles, are often sold as pets. This has been reported to occur even in places where such practices are illegal.

Birds
Bird hatchlings may be altricial or precocial. Altricial means that the young hatch naked and with their eyes closed, and rely totally on their parents for feeding and warmth. Precocial hatching are feathered when hatched, and can leave the nest immediately. In birds, such as the bobwhite quail, hatchlings' auditory systems are more developed than their visual system, as visual stimulation is not present in the egg, while auditory stimulation can reach the embryo even before birth. It has also been shown that auditory development in hatchlings is disrupted by environments high in visual and social stimulation. Many hatchlings are born with some forms of innate behaviours which allow them to improve their ability to survive: for example, hatchling gulls instinctively peck at long objects with marked colour contrast, which leads them to peck at their parents' bills, eliciting a feeding response. Endocrine disruption of hatchling birds increases the rate of deformities and lowers the chances of survival. In bearded vultures, two eggs are laid, but one hatchling will often kill the other. Bird hatchlings raised by humans have sometimes been noted to act towards their human caregivers as their parents.

References

Ornithology
Bird breeding